AB Snaigė (literally: snowflake) is a Lithuanian industrial company and the only producer of refrigerators in the Baltic countries, with manufacturing plants in Alytus. It is listed on the NASDAQ OMX Vilnius stock exchange. The company was established in 1963. The unaudited consolidated sales revenue of AB "Snaigė" exceeded 30 million during the three quarters of 2017. EUR and were slightly lower than last year during the same period. The company earned 1.6 million EUR EBITDA (in unaudited consolidated data) vol. i.e. 56 percent less than last year during the same period. About 97% of the production is exported to more than 30 countries.

SNAIGE AB produces refrigerators, freezers and vertical coolers of over 30 models in about 200 modifications. The company has a production capacity of 550,000 refrigerators and freezers per year. The company has been awarded the Lithuanian Innovation Prize several times and is recognized as one of the most innovative companies in the country. Refrigerators Snaigė have been a few times presented with Lithuanian "Product of the Year" Gold medals.

Works according ISO international standards (ISO 9001, ISO 1400, BS OHSAS 18001) are used throughout the production process.

External links

References 

1963 establishments in Lithuania
Manufacturing companies established in 1963
Companies listed on Nasdaq Vilnius
Home appliance manufacturers of Lithuania
Lithuanian brands
Alytus
Manufacturing companies of the Soviet Union